Elections to Fife Council were held on 3 May 2007, the same day as the other Scottish local government elections and the Scottish Parliament general election. The election was the first one using 23 new wards created as a result of the Local Governance (Scotland) Act 2004, each ward will elect three or four councillors using the single transferable vote system form of proportional representation. The new wards replace 78 single-member wards which used the plurality (first past the post) system of election.

Scottish National Party and Scottish Liberal Democrats formed a coalition to run the council for the next 5 years.

Election results

Ward results

Changes Since 2007 Election
†East Neuk and Landward, Cllr Mike Scott-Hayward joined the United Kingdom Independence Party after leaving the Conservative Party
††Kirkcaldy East, Cllr George Leslie quit the Scottish National Party and became an Independent

References

External links
 Election Results on FifeDirect 

2007 Scottish local elections
2007
21st century in Fife
May 2007 events in the United Kingdom